Yashbant Narayan Singh Laguri (born 18 April 1971) is a member of the 15th Lok Sabha of India. He represents the Keonjhar constituency of Odisha and is a member of the Biju Janata Dal (BJD) political party.

See also
 Keonjhar (Lok Sabha constituency)
 Indian general election in Orissa, 2009
 Biju Janata Dal

References

External links

People from Odisha
Odisha politicians
Biju Janata Dal politicians
India MPs 2009–2014
1971 births
Living people
Lok Sabha members from Odisha
People from Kendujhar district